The 1924 Democratic National Convention, held at the Madison Square Garden in New York City from June 24 to July 9, 1924, was the longest continuously running convention in United States political history. It took a record 103 ballots to nominate a presidential candidate. It was the first major party national convention that saw the name of a woman, Lena Springs, placed in nomination for the vice president. John W. Davis, a dark horse, eventually won the presidential nomination on the 103rd ballot, a compromise candidate following a protracted convention fight between distant front-runners William Gibbs McAdoo and Al Smith.

Davis and his vice presidential running-mate, Governor Charles W. Bryan of Nebraska, went on to be defeated by the Republican ticket of President Calvin Coolidge and Charles G. Dawes in the 1924 presidential election.

Site selection 
The selection of New York as the site for the 1924 convention was based in part on the recent success of the party in that state. Two years earlier, in 1922, thirteen Republican congressmen had lost their seats to Democrats. New York had not been chosen for a convention since 1868. Wealthy New Yorkers, who had outbid other cities, declared their purpose "to convince the rest of the country that the town was not the red-light menace generally conceived by the sticks". Though "dry" organizations that supported continuing the prohibition of alcohol opposed the choice of New York, it won McAdoo's grudging consent in the fall of 1923, before the oil scandals made Smith a serious threat to him. (McAdoo's candidacy was hurt by the revelation that he had accepted money from Edward L. Doheny, an oil tycoon implicated in the Teapot Dome scandal.) McAdoo's own adopted state, California, had played host to the Democrats in 1920.

The primaries 

McAdoo swept the primaries in the first real race in the history of the party, although most states chose delegates through party organizations and conventions, giving most of their projected votes to local or hometown candidates, referred to as "favorite sons".

Ku Klux Klan presence 

The Ku Klux Klan had surged in popularity after World War I, due to its leadership's connections to passage of the successful Prohibition Amendment to the U.S. Constitution. This made the Klan a political power throughout many regions of the United States, and it reached the apex of its power in the mid-1920s, when it exerted deep cultural and political influence on both Republicans and Democrats. Its supporters had successfully quashed an anti-Klan resolution before it ever went to a floor vote at the 1924 Republican National Convention earlier in June, and proponents expected to exert the same influence at the Democratic convention. Instead, tension between pro- and anti-Klan delegates produced an intense and sometimes violent showdown between convention attendees from the states of Colorado and Missouri. Klan delegates opposed the nomination of New York Governor Al Smith because Smith was a Roman Catholic and an opponent of Prohibition, and most supported William Gibbs McAdoo. Non-Klan delegates, led by Sen. Oscar Underwood of Alabama, attempted to add condemnation of the organization for its violence to the Democratic Party's platform. The measure was narrowly defeated, and the anti-KKK plank was not included in the platform.

Roosevelt comeback 
Smith's name was placed into nomination by Franklin D. Roosevelt, in a speech in which Roosevelt dubbed Smith "The Happy Warrior". Roosevelt's speech, which has since become a well-studied example of political oratory, was his first major political appearance since the paralytic illness he had contracted in 1921. The success of this speech and his other convention efforts in support of Smith signaled that he was still a viable figure in politics, and he nominated Smith again in 1928. Roosevelt succeeded Smith as governor in 1929, and went on to win election as president in 1932.

Results

Presidential candidates 

The first day of balloting (June 30) brought the predicted deadlock between the leading aspirants for the nomination, William G. McAdoo of California and Gov. Alfred E. Smith of New York, with the remainder divided mainly between local "favorite sons". McAdoo was the leader from the outset, and both he and Smith made small gains in the day's fifteen ballots, but the prevailing belief among the delegates was that the impasse could only be broken by the elimination of both McAdoo and Smith and the selection of one of the other contenders; much interest centred about the candidacy of John W. Davis, who also increased his vote during the day from 31 to 61 (with a peak of 64.5 votes on the 13th and 14th ballots). Most of the favorite son delegations refused to be stampeded to either of the leading candidates and were in no hurry to retire from the contest.

In the early balloting many delegations appeared to be jockeying for position, and some of the original votes were purely complimentary and seemed to conceal the real sentiments of the delegates. Louisiana, for example, which was bound by the "unit rule" (all the state's delegate votes would be cast in favor of the candidate favored by a majority of them), first complimented its neighbor Arkansas by casting its 20 votes for Sen. Joseph T. Robinson, then it switched to Sen. Carter Glass, and on another ballot Maryland Gov. Albert C. Ritchie got the twenty, before the delegation finally settled on John W. Davis.

There was some excitement on the tenth ballot, when Kansas abandoned Gov. Jonathan M. Davis and threw its votes to McAdoo. There was an instant uproar among McAdoo delegates and supporters, and a parade was started around the hall, the Kansas standard leading, with those of all the other McAdoo states coming along behind, and pictures of "McAdoo, Democracy's Hope", being lifted up. After six minutes the chairman's gavel brought order and the roll call resumed, and soon the other side had something to cheer, when New Jersey made its favorite son, Gov. George S. Silzer, walk the plank and threw its votes into the Smith column. This started another parade, the New York and New Jersey standards leading those of the other Smith delegations around the hall while the band played "Tramp, Tramp, Tramp, the Boys are Marching".

First ballot

Fifteenth ballot

Twentieth ballot 
McAdoo and Smith each evolved a strategy to build up his own total slowly. Smith's trick was to plant his extra votes for his opponent, so that McAdoo's strength might later appear to be waning; the Californian countered by holding back his full force, though he had been planning a strong early show. But by no sleight of hand could the convention have been swung around to either contestant. With the party split into two assertive parts, the rule requiring a two-thirds majority for nomination crippled the chances of both candidates by giving a veto each could—and did—use. McAdoo himself wanted to drop the two-thirds rule, but his Protestant supporters preferred to keep their veto over a Catholic candidate, and the South regarded the rule as protection against a northern nominee unfavorable to southern interests. At no point in the balloting did Smith receive more than a single vote from the South and scarcely more than 20 votes from the states west of the Mississippi; he never won more than 368 of the 729 votes needed for nomination, though even this performance was impressive for a Roman Catholic. McAdoo's strength fluctuated more widely, reaching its highest point of 528 on the seventieth ballot. Since both candidates occasionally received purely strategic aid, the nucleus of their support was probably even less. The remainder of the votes were divided among dark horses and favorite sons who had spun high hopes since the Doheny testimony; understandably, they hesitated to withdraw their own candidacies as long as the convention was so clearly divided.

Thirtieth ballot 
As time passed, the maneuvers of the two factions took on the character of desperation. Daniel C. Roper even went to Franklin Roosevelt, reportedly to offer Smith second place on a McAdoo ticket. For their part, the Tammany men tried to prolong the convention until the hotel bills were beyond the means of the delegates who had traveled to the convention. The Smith backers also attempted to stampede the delegates by packing the galleries with noisy rooters. Senator James Phelan of California, among others, complained of "New York rowdyism". But the rudeness of Tammany, particularly their delegates' booing of William Jennings Bryan when he spoke to the convention, only steeled the resolution of the country delegates. McAdoo and Bryan both tried unsuccessfully to adjourn and then reconvene in another city, perhaps Washington, D.C., or St. Louis.

Forty-second ballot

Sixty-first ballot 
As a last resort, McAdoo supporters introduced a motion to eliminate one candidate on each ballot until only five remained, but Smith delegates and those supporting favorite sons managed to defeat the McAdoo strategy. Smith countered by suggesting that all delegates be released from their pledges—to which McAdoo agreed on condition that the two-thirds rule be eliminated—although Smith fully expected that loyalty would prevent the disaffection of Indiana and Illinois votes, both controlled by political bosses friendly to him. Indeed, Senator David Walsh of Massachusetts expressed the sentiment that moved Smith backers: "We must continue to do all that we can to nominate Smith. If it should develop that he cannot be nominated, then McAdoo cannot have it either." For his part, McAdoo would angrily quit the convention once he lost: but the sixty-first inconclusive round—when the convention set a record for length of balloting—was no time to admit defeat.

Seventieth ballot 

It had seemed for a time that the nomination could go to Senator Samuel Ralston of Indiana. Advanced by Indiana party boss Thomas Taggart, Ralston's candidacy might attract support from the Bryans, given that Charles Bryan had written, "Ralston is the most promising of the compromise candidates." Ralston was also a favorite of the Klan and a second choice of many McAdoo delegates. In 1922, he had launched an attack on parochial schools that the Klan saw as an endorsement of its own views, and he won several normally Republican counties dominated by the Klan. Commenting on the Klan issue, Ralston said that it would create a bad precedent to denounce any organization by name in the platform. Much of Ralston's support came from the South and West—states including Oklahoma, Missouri, and Nevada that had strong Klan elements. According to Claude Bowers, McAdoo said: "I like the old Senator, like his simplicity, honesty, record"; and it was reported that he told Smith supporters he would withdraw only in favor of Ralston. As with John W. Davis, Ralston had few enemies, and his support from men as divergent as the Bryans and Taggart cast him as a viable compromise choice. He passed Davis, the almost consistent third choice, on the fifty-second ballot; but Taggart then discouraged the boom for the time being because the McAdoo and Smith phalanxes showed no signs of weakening. On July 8, the eighty-seventh ballot showed a total for Ralston of 93 votes, chiefly from Indiana and Missouri; before the day was over, the Ralston total had risen to almost 200, a larger tally than Davis had ever received. Most of these votes were drawn from McAdoo, to whom they later returned.

Numerous sources indicate that Taggart was not exaggerating when he later said: "We would have nominated Senator Ralston if he had not withdrawn his name at the last minute. It was a near certainty as anything in politics could be. We had pledges of enough delegates that would shift to Ralston on a certain ballot to have nominated him." Ralston wavered on whether to make the race; despite his doctor's stern recommendation not to run and the illness of his wife and son, Ralston had told Taggart that he would be a candidate, albeit a reluctant one. But the 300-pound Ralston finally telegraphed his refusal to go on; sixty-six years old at the time of the convention, he died the following year.

Seventy-seventh ballot

Eighty-seventh ballot

One hundredth ballot

One hundred third ballot 

The nomination was finally awarded to John W. Davis, a compromise candidate, on the one hundred third ballot, after the withdrawal of Smith and McAdoo. Davis had never been a genuine dark horse candidate; he had almost always been third in the balloting, and by the end of the 29th round he was the betting favorite of New York gamblers. There had been a Davis movement of considerable size at the 1920 San Francisco convention; however, Charles Hamlin wrote in his diary, Davis "frankly said ... that he was not seeking [the nomination] and that if nominated he would accept only as a matter of public duty". For Vice President, the Democrats nominated Charles W. Bryan, the governor of Nebraska and the brother of William Jennings Bryan, and for many years editor of The Commoner.

Full Balloting 
A total of 58 candidates received votes over the 103 ballots, and the second ballot was the one where most candidates were voted for (20 in total).

The alphabetically sorted list of all 58 candidates:
 Henry Tureman Allen
 Newton D. Baker
 John T. Barnett
 George G. Battle
 Martin Behrman
 George L. Berry
 Fred H. Brown
 Charles W. Bryan
 William Jennings Bryan
 John M. Callahan
 Marcus A. Coolidge
 Royal S. Copeland
 James M. Cox
 William Coyne
 Homer Stille Cummings
 Josephus Daniels
 Jonathan M. Davis
 John W. Davis
 William Emmett Dever
 Edward L. Doheny
 Edward I. Edwards
 Woodbridge N. Ferris
 William Alexander Gaston
 James W. Gerard
 Carter Glass
 Pat Harrison
 Gilbert Hitchcock
 David F. Houston
 Cordell Hull
 J. Holmes Jackson
 John B. Kendrick
 J. Richard Kevin
 Roland Krebs
 William Maloney
 Thomas R. Marshall
 Fred C. Martin
 William G. McAdoo
 Edwin T. Meredith
 Emma Guffey "Belle" Miller
 Albert A. Murphree
 Robert Latham Owen
 Atlee Pomerene
 Samuel M. Ralston
 Albert Ritchie
 Joseph Taylor Robinson
 Will Rogers
 Franklin D. Roosevelt
 Willard Saulsbury Jr.
 George Sebastian Silzer
 Al Smith
 Thomas J. Spellacy
 Cora Wilson Stewart
 William Ellery Sweet
 Samuel Huston Thompson
 Oscar Underwood
 David I. Walsh
 Thomas J. Walsh
 Burton K. Wheeler

Vice Presidential nomination 
13 names were placed into nomination for Davis' vice-presidential running mate, and early in the process, the permitted length of speeches was limited to five minutes each.

Despite this, the only ballot was chaotic, with thirty people, including three women, getting at least one vote for the nomination.

George Berry, a labor union leader from Tennessee, trailed Charles W. Bryan, Governor of Nebraska, by a vote of 332 to 270.5. Bryan had been chosen by a group of party leaders, including Davis and Al Smith. The party leaders first asked Montana Senator Thomas J. Walsh to run for vice president, but Walsh refused. New Jersey Governor George Sebastian Silzer, Newton D. Baker, and Maryland Governor Albert Ritchie were also considered, but Bryan was proposed as a candidate who could unite the Smith and McAdoo factions. After the end of the first ballot, a cascade of switches from various candidates to Bryan took place, and Bryan was nominated with 739 votes. Notably, he remains, as of 2020, the only brother of a previous nominee (William Jennings Bryan) to be nominated by a major party.

The official tally was:

Prayers 
Each of the convention's 23 sessions was opened with an invocation by a different nationally prominent clergyman. The choices represented the party's coalition at the time: there were five Episcopalian ministers; three Presbyterians; three Lutherans; two Roman Catholics; two Baptists; two Methodists; one each from the Congregationalists, Disciples of Christ, Unitarians, and Christian Scientists; and two Jewish rabbis. All of the clergy were white men; African-American denominations were not represented.

With the convention deadlocked over the choice of a nominee, some of the invocations became calls for the delegates and candidates to put aside sectionalism and ambition in favor of party unity.

Among the clergy who spoke to the convention:

 Catholics included Patrick Joseph Hayes, Archbishop of New York, and Francis Patrick Duffy, Chaplain of the New York National Guard.
 Episcopalians, such as Thomas F. Gailor, Bishop of Tennessee, and Wythe Leigh Kinsolving, Chaplain of the Virginian Society of New York.
 The roster included, on different days, two fierce antagonists and frequent debaters on the theory of evolution and Biblical inerrancy, John Roach Straton, a Baptist conservative, and Charles Francis Potter, a Unitarian Modernist.
 Rabbi Stephen Samuel Wise, founder of the Free Synagogue, who was also a delegate from New York.
 Dr. Frederick Hermann Knubel, president of the United Lutheran Churches in America.

Legacy 
In his acceptance speech, Davis made the perfunctory statement that he would enforce the prohibition law, but his conservatism prejudiced him in favor of personal liberty and home rule and he was frequently denounced as a wet. The dry leader Wayne Wheeler complained of Davis's "constant repetition of wet catch phrases like 'personal liberty', 'illegal search and seizure', and 'home rule'". After the convention Davis tried to satisfy both factions of his party, but his support came principally from the same city elements that had backed Cox in 1920. The last surviving participant from the convention was Diana Serra Cary, who as a five-year-old child film star was the convention's official mascot; she died on February 24, 2020, at the age of 101.

 This was the first Democratic National Convention broadcast on radio.
 The first seconding address by a woman in either national political parties was given by Izetta Jewel at this convention, seconding John Davis, and Abby Crawford Milton, seconding McAdoo.
 During his 1960 campaign, John F. Kennedy cited the dilemma of the Massachusetts delegation at the 1924 Democratic National Convention when making light of his own campaign problems: "Either we must switch to a more liberal candidate or move to a cheaper hotel."
 Both Franklin D. Roosevelt and Al Smith were filmed during the convention by Lee de Forest using his Phonofilm sound-on-film process. These films are in the Maurice Zouary collection at the Library of Congress.

"Klanbake" meme 

In 2015, conservative blogs and Facebook pages started circulating a photo of hooded Klansmen supposedly marching at the 1924 DNC. In early 2017, a pro-Donald Trump Facebook group called "ElectTrump2020" turned the photo into a meme which was shared more than 18,000 times on Facebook alone. Author Dinesh D'Souza shared the photo and the meme on Twitter in September 2017.  In fact, the widely circulated photo depicted a December 1924 march by Klansmen in Madison, Wisconsin, and had no connection to any political convention. The term "Klanbake" appears to have been coined by New York Daily News columnist Joseph A. Cowan, in a satirical column reporting on the Convention at the time. Cowan also used the derisive terms "klanvention" and "klandidate." In 2000, a Daily News reporter included the term in an historical article about the 1924 convention, stating erroneously that "newspapers" referred to the convention as the Klanbake, when in fact Cowan was the only writer to use the term.

See also 
 History of the United States Democratic Party
 Democratic Party presidential primaries, 1924
 List of Democratic National Conventions
 U.S. presidential nomination convention
 1924 Republican National Convention
 1924 United States presidential election

References

Further reading 
 Burner, David. The Politics of Provincialism: The Democratic Party in Transition, 1918-1932 (1968)
 Chalmers, David. "The Ku Klux Klan in politics in the 1920's." Mississippi Quarterly 18.4 (1965): 234-247 online.
 Goldberg, David J. "Unmasking the Ku Klux Klan: The northern movement against the KKK, 1920-1925." Journal of American Ethnic History (1996): 32-48 online.
 
 McVeigh, Rory. "Power Devaluation, the Ku Klux Klan, and the Democratic National Convention of 1924." Sociological Forum 16#1 (2001) abstract.
 Martinson, David L. "Coverage of La Follette Offers Insights for 1972 Campaign." Journalism Quarterly 52.3 (1975): 539–542.
 Prude, James C. "William Gibbs McAdoo and the Democratic National Convention of 1924." Journal of Southern History 38.4 (1972): 621-628 online.

External links 
 Democratic Party Platform of 1924 at The American Presidency Project

Democratic National Convention
Democratic National Convention
Democratic National Convention
Political conventions in New York City
New York State Democratic Committee
Democratic National Conventions
Democratic National Convention
Democratic National Convention
1920s in Manhattan
Madison Square Garden